Adventure Playhouse is the umbrella title of an early American television program broadcast on the now defunct DuMont Television Network. The series ran from April to May of 1950.

The one-hour-long program, produced and distributed by DuMont, aired pre-1948 films on Wednesday nights from 8-9 pm ET on most DuMont affiliates. The series was not renewed after the initial short run.

The May 29, 1950, episode was "Battle Scene".

See also
List of programs broadcast by the DuMont Television Network
List of surviving DuMont Television Network broadcasts

References

Bibliography
David Weinstein, The Forgotten Network: DuMont and the Birth of American Television (Philadelphia: Temple University Press, 2004) 
Alex McNeil, Total Television, Fourth edition (New York: Penguin Books, 1980) 
Tim Brooks and Earle Marsh, The Complete Directory to Prime Time Network TV Shows, Third edition (New York: Ballantine Books, 1964)

External links
DuMont historical website

1950 American television series debuts
1950 American television series endings
Black-and-white American television shows
DuMont Television Network original programming